The Jaguar I-Pace eTrophy (stylised as "I-PACE eTROPHY")  is a race-spec version racecar of the Jaguar I-Pace, designed specifically to race in the one-make series of the same name. Many motorsport and supply companies, such as Bosch Motorsport, ABB, and Michelin, worked together in collaboration with Jaguar, specifically the Special Vehicle Operations department, to develop the racecar. On January 11, 2018, Michelin would be announced to be the official tire supplier for the racecar.

Specifications 
The racecar was built by Jaguar Land Rover Special Vehicle Operations, and developed from the road going Jaguar I-Pace. Many aerodynamic improvements have been made over the standard I-Pace, such as the addition of a rear wing and a revised exterior, a new front splitter, especially the front fascia and the sides, to create anti-lift and better direct air flow to cool the battery and motors. Additional changes include a lower ride height (by 30 mm), longer length (by 173 mm). slightly longer width (by 6 mm), a weight slash of up to 450 lb, etc. The length of the wheelbase of the I-Pace eTrophy racecar is the same as the road car. Power is increased to 436 hp (442 PS), from 395 hp (400 PS) as that of the road car, with a slight increase in torque to 700 Nm (513.4 lb-ft) of torque, from the 696 Nm (513 lb-ft) of the road car. The all-wheel drive format also remains the same, with 2 electric motors, one at each axle, powered by the same 90 kWh lithium-ion battery. An upgraded A/C system is used to not only further cool the battery pack, but also the electric motors. The racecar also features a full FIA-approved roll-cage and a bespoke 11-setting ABS system developed by Bosch Motorsport. The racecar also sits on 22-inch Michelin Pilot Super Sport all-condition tires. The regenerative braking, with brakes by ABB, can allow the racecar to go through a maximum of 0.4 g of deceleration. Torque distribution can be adjusted, up to a maximum of 50% at the front and 50% at the rear. The racecar takes 4.5 seconds to go from 0 to 60 mph (100 km/h), slashing 0.3 seconds from the roadcar. The racecar also has a top speed of 121 mph (200 km/h), the same as the roadcar. Only 20 units were made, and each one cost $260,000.

Debuts 
The Jaguar I-Pace eTrophy had its first track unveiling at the 2018 Ad Diriyah ePrix. Earlier, the racecar had its first public view anywhere as a concept at the 2017 Frankfurt Motor Show. It was also a competitor at the 2019 Goodwood Festival of Speed.

References

External links 

 Jaguar I-Pace eTrophy racecar and series @ Jaguar
 Jaguar I-Pace eTrophy racecar specifications

Crossover sport utility vehicles
I-Pace
Production electric cars
Electric sports cars
Cars introduced in 2018
2020s cars